Mirjana Majurec (23 August 1952 – 2 April 2022) was a Croatian actress.

Life and career
Mirjana was born on 23 August 1952 and graduated from the Zagreb Academy of Dramatic Arts in 1976. She devoted more than thirty years to work in the Gavella Drama Theatre.

She was diagnosed with breast cancer in April 2010 and immediately started chemotherapy.

She loved her life and her family. As well as her husband. Which is why her death hit hard.

Personal life
Mirjana was the wife of the actor Ivica Vidović, whom she married in 1975, and with whom she had a son Luka. Ten years later, she married for the second time - to football player Marko Mlinarić, with whom she went to live in Cannes, where she gave birth to her second son, Ivan.

Death
She died in Zagreb at the age of 69 from breast cancer.

Selected filmography

References

External links

1952 births
2022 deaths
Croatian film actresses
Croatian stage actresses
Croatian television actresses
Actors from Split, Croatia
Burials at Mirogoj Cemetery